Thad is a masculine given name, often a short form (hypocorism) of Thaddeus. It may refer to:

Thad Allen (born 1949), United States Coast Guard admiral
 Thad Altman (born 1955), American politician
 Thad Balkman (born 1971), American politician, lawyer, and judge
 Thaddeus Thad Bingel, American educator and political consultant
 Thaddis Thad Bosley (born 1956), American baseball player
 Thaddeus Thad F. Brown (1902–1970), American police chief
 Thad Busby (born 1974), American football player
 Thaddeus Thad Carhart (born 1950), American writer
 Thad Castle, character in the TV series Blue Mountain State
 William Thad Cochran (1937–2019), United States Senator from Mississippi
 Thad Cockrell, American singer-songwriter
 Thaddeus Thad A. Eure (1899–1993), American politician
 Thad McIntosh Guyer (born 1950), American lawyer
 Thad Heartfield (1940–2022), American lawyer and federal judge
 Thaddeus Thad Hutcheson (1915–1986), American attorney and politician
 Thad J. Jakubowski (1924–2013), American Roman Catholic bishop
 Thad Jaracz (born 1946), American basketball player
 Thaddeus Thad Jones (1923–1986), American jazz trumpeter and bandleader
 Thad Krasnesky (fl. 2000s–2020s), American children's author
 Thad Levine (born 1971), American baseball executive
 Thaddeus Thad Lewis (born 1987), American football player
 Thaddeus Thad Luckinbill (born 1975), American actor and film producer
 Thad Matta (born 1967), American men's basketball coach
 Thad McArthur (born 1928), American Olympic modern pentathlete
 Thad McClammy (born 1942), American politician
 Thaddus Thad McFadden (American football) (born 1962), American football player
 Thaddus Thad McFadden (basketball) (born 1987), American basketball player
 Thaddeus Thad Moffitt (born 2000), American racing driver
 Thaddeus Thad Mumford (1951–2018), American television writer and producer
 Thaddeus Thad Spencer (1943–2013), American heavyweight boxer
 Thad Starner (fl. 1980s–2010s), American computer scientist
 Thaddeus Thad Stem Jr. (1916–1980), American author and poet
 Thaddeus Stevens (1792–1868), United States Representative from Pennsylvania
 Robert Thaddeus R. Thad Taylor (1925–2006), American theatre director
 Thaddeus Thad Tillotson (1940–2012), American baseball pitcher
 Thad Vann (1907–1982), American football player and coach
 Thad Viers (born 1978), American politician
 Thad Vreeland Jr. (1924–2010), American materials scientist 
 Thad Weber (born 1984), American baseball pitcher

Masculine given names
Hypocorisms